Route 40 is a common name for roads and highways in many countries.

Route 40 may also refer to:

QuickBus, a bus rapid transit service Baltimore, Maryland and its suburbs designated Route 40
London Buses route 40

40